The 2000 Hamburg Masters was a men's tennis tournament played on outdoor clay courts. It was the 94th edition of the Hamburg Masters, and was part of the ATP Masters Series of the 2000 ATP Tour. It took place at the Rothenbaum Tennis Center in Hamburg, Germany, from through 15 May until 22 May 2000. Fifth-seeded Gustavo Kuerten won the ingles title.

Finals

Singles

 Gustavo Kuerten defeated  Marat Safin 6–4, 5–7, 6–4, 5–7, 7–6(7–3)
It was Kuerten's 2nd title of the year, and his 7th overall. It was his 1st Masters title of the year, and his 3rd overall.

Doubles

 Todd Woodbridge /  Mark Woodforde defeated  Wayne Arthurs /  Sandon Stolle, 6–7(4–7), 6–4, 6–3

References

External links
   
 ATP tournament profile

 
Hamburg Masters
Hamburg Masters
Hamburg European Open